Certificate in Management Studies (CMS) also referred as Certificate in Management, Graduate Certificate in Management, Masters Entry Certificate in Management, is a UK undergraduate qualification normally comprising 3-4 modules of study in the area of Management. It forms the first half of Diploma in Management Studies (DMS).

Pathway
The CMS & DMS form the pathway for many students going onto complete MBA's. Most of the institutions offering the CMS/DMS offer the MBA as the final stage or the credit for achieving the DMS can be transferred to another institution. The exams and coursework undertaken at this level serves as a foundation for similar assessment at the MBA level where there is a strong focus on research and written reports.

Institutions offering the CMS

References

http://www.glos.ac.uk/courses/professional/cms
http://www.northampton.ac.uk/courses/.../certificate-in-management-studies-cms
http://www.dmu.ac.uk/course/management-studies-3090
https://web.archive.org/web/20110303231404/http://www.hud.ac.uk/courses/course/index.php?ipp=0001216&year=2011-12
http://www.rdi.co.uk/vmchk/management-pathway/127-certificate-in-management.html

Management Studies
Management education